This is a list of vehicles marketed under the Chevrolet brand.

Current production vehicles 
Keys

Currently produced under license 

 Chevrolet Cobalt (Uzbekistan)
 Chevrolet Damas (Uzbekistan)
 Chevrolet D-Max (Ecuador)
 Chevrolet Joy (Colombia)
 Chevrolet Joy Plus (Colombia)
 Chevrolet Labo (Uzbekistan)
 Chevrolet Lacetti (Uzbekistan)
 Chevrolet Nexia (Uzbekistan)
 Chevrolet Spark (M300) (Uzbekistan)
 Chevrolet T-Series (Egypt)

Notes

Past models

United States 
Models originally designed and manufactured in the United States (rebadged models are included in another separate list):

Notes

Global  
Chevrolet cars marketed and/or produced outside the United States:

Notes

Other past vehicles 

Notes

Concept cars 

 Chevrolet Aero 2003A (1987)
 Aerovette (1976)
 Astro I (1967)
 Astro II (1968)
 Astro III (1969)
 Astrovette (1968)
 Aveo RS (2010)
 Beat (concept) (2007)
 Bel Air Concept (2002)
 Biscayne (concept) (1955)
 Blazer XT-1 (1987)
 Bolt (2015)
 Borrego (2001)
 California IROC Camaro (1989)
 Camaro Black Concept (2008)
 Camaro Chroma Concept (2009)
 Camaro Concept (2006)
 Camaro Convertible Concept (2007)
 Camaro Convertible Concept (2010)
 Camaro Dale Earnhardt Jr. Concept (2008)
 Camaro Dusk Concept (2009)
 Camaro GS Racecar Concept (2008)
 Camaro LS7 Concept (2008)
 Camaro LT5 (1988)
 Camaro SS (concept) (2003)
 Camaro SSX (2010)
Camaro z/28 (2012)
 Camaro ZL1 (concept) (2011)
 Caprice PPV (Concept) (2010)
 Cheyenne (concept) (2003)
 Citation IV (1984)
 Cobalt (concept) (2011)
 Code 130R (2012)
 Colorado Concept (2011)
 CERV (1960, 1964, 1990, 1992)
 Corvair (concept) (1954)
 Corvair (concept) (1960)
 Corvair Coupe Speciale (1960, 1962, 1963)
 Corvair Monza GT (1962)
 Corvair Monza SS (1962)
 Corvair Sebring Spyder (1961)
 Corvair Super Spyder (1962)
 Chevrolet Testudo (1963)
 Corvette (concept) (1953)
 Corvette C2 (concept) (1962)
 Corvette Indy (1986)
 Corvette Nivola (1990)
 Corvette Stingray (concept) (1959)
 Corvette Stingray (concept) (2009)
 Corvette XP-700 (1958)
 Corvette XP-819 Rear Engine (1964)
 Corvette Z03 (2008)
 Corvette Z06X (2010)
 Corvette ZR1 (concept) (2008)
 Corvette ZR2 (1989)
 Cruze (concept) (2010)
 Cruze Eco (concept) (2011)
 Cruze RS (concept) (2011)
 GPiX (2008)
 Equinox Xtreme (2003)
 E-Spark (2010)
 Express (1987)
 FNR (2015)
 FNR-XE (2022)
 Groove (2007)
 Highlander (1993)
 HHR (2005)
 Impala (concept) (1956)
 Jay Leno Camaro (2009)
 M3X (2004)
 Mako Shark (1961)
 Mako Shark II (1965)
 Malibu (concept) (2011)
 Malibu Maxx (2003)
 Miray (2012)
 Manta Ray (1969)
 Mulsanne (1974)
 Nomad (concept) (1954, 1999, 2004)
 Orlando (concept) (2008)
 Colorado Rally (2011)
 Q-Corvette (1957)
 Ramarro (1984)
 Rondine (1963)
 S3X (2004)
 Scirocco (1970)
 Sequel (2005)
 Silverado 427 Concept (2007)
 Silverado Orange County Choppers Hauler (2007)
 Silverado ZR2 (2010)
 Sonic (concept) (2010)
 Sonic Z-Spec (2011)
 SR-2 (1957)
 SS (2003)
 Suburban 75th Anniversary Diamond Edition (2010)
 Super Carry (van)
 Synergy Camaro concept (2009)
 T2X (2005)
 Tandem 2000 (1999)
 Trailblazer SS Concept (2002)
 Trax (2007)
 Triax (2000)
 Tru 140S (2012) 
 Venture (1988)
 Volt (concept) (2007)
 Volt MPV5 EV (2010)
 Wedge Corvette (1963)
 WTCC Ultra (2006)
 XP-882 Four Rotor (1973)
 XP-895 Reynolds (1973)
 XP-897GT Two-Rotor (1973)
 XP-898 (1973)
 XT-2 (1989)
 YGM1 (1999)

Experimental cars 
 CERV I (1959)
 CERV II (1963)
 CERV III (1985)
 CERV IV (1993)
 CERV IV-B (1997)

Prototypes 

 Corvette (1983)
 Corvette ZR-1 Active Suspension prototype (1990)

See also
 List of Chevrolet pickup trucks

References

Chevrolet